Café Hafa is a cafe in Tangier, Morocco, located along the cliff top overlooking the Bay of Tangier. Opened in 1921, the cafe still has its original decor. Visitors have included Paul Bowles, William S. Burroughs, Juan Goytisolo, Sean Connery, The Beatles, and the Rolling Stones. Precisely due to the visits of artists and celebrities attributed to this café; singer-songwriter, musician, painter and director Luis Eduardo Aute dedicated a song to him, included in his album "Slowly", titled Hafa Café. In it he tells how being there in the company of a woman, Mick Jagger arrived and his friend left with him. The cafe is known for its mint tea, a Tangier special brew.

References

External links
Flickr images

Buildings and structures in Tangier
Restaurants established in 1921
1921 establishments in Morocco
Coffeehouses and cafés
Tourist attractions in Tangier
20th-century architecture in Morocco